Al-Riyadh Saudi Club is a football team based in Riyadh, Saudi Arabia, that is currently playing in the Saudi first division (second level). It was established in 1953 as Ahli Al-Riyadh, then changed to Al-Yamamah and finally to Al-Riyadh.

Best known for its football team, Al-Riyadh also have squads in other sports. They have won two major titles: a Crown Prince Cup in 1994 and a Crown Prince Cup in 1995; they also finished runners-up in the Saudi Premier League in 1994.

History

Early history 
The club was founded in 1953 under the name "Ahli Al-Riyadh", before changing to "Al-Yamama" and then to "Al-Riyadh"; it is currently based in west Riyadh.

Golden Area

In the early-1990s, under the leadership of Brazilian coach Zumario and players such as Khalid Al-Qarouni, Talal Al-Jabreen, Yasser Al-Taafi and Fahd Al-Hamdan, Al-Riyadh won the Crown Prince Cup in 1994 and reached the semi-final of Asian Cup Winners' Cup in 1995.

Honours

Domestic 
Saudi Premier League
Runners-up (1): 1993–94
Saudi First Division League
Winners (2): 1977–78, 1988–89
Runners-up (2): 1979–80, 1982–83
Kings CupRunners-up (2): 1962, 1978
Crown Prince Cup
Winners (1): 1993–94Runners-up (2): 1994–95, 1997–98
Prince Faisal Cup
Winners (1): 1994–95

 Continental 
Arab Super Cup
Runners-up (1): 1996

 Current squad As of Saudi Second Division:''

Asian record

References

 
Football clubs in Saudi Arabia
Football clubs in Riyadh
1953 establishments in Saudi Arabia
Association football clubs established in 1953
Sport in Riyadh